The hanbō (半棒, "half-staff") is a staff used in martial arts. However, depending on the school the length and diameter varied.

As with any weapon, bearers would often find one best suited to their build, opting often for one that comes up to about waist/hip height.

Usage
Hanbōjutsu, the art of wielding the hanbō, is a focus in several martial arts including the Kukishin-ryū koryū classical school of martial arts, and Kukishinden-ryū, one of the nine schools of Bujinkan Budo Taijutsu. Part of the importance in using this length is that it is approximately that of a walking cane. Although techniques with a cane in this ryū-ha utilize pulling or hooking and possess one rounded end, they invariably function the same as a hanbō in all other respects. The hanbō can be held toward one end, and be swung like a katana or kendo sword. Additionally, it can be held in the middle like a staff and strike and block from either end.

The hanbō can be used as a means of striking, restraining or even throwing someone.
It is useful to know because sticks are abundant and can be picked up if attacked. Masaaki Hatsumi says that one who wishes to be a swordsman should first master hanbō techniques, since it can be held and utilized in a similar fashion to a Japanese sword (but without the cutting edge). When utilized properly (parrying by deflecting the sword by striking the flat parts of the blade), it can be used against a katana.

See also
 Bō
 Budō
 Bujutsu
 Jō
 Tambo or Tanjo 
 Quarterstaff
 Stick fighting
 Bujinkan
 Hontai-Yoshin-ryū
 Kukishinden-ryū

References

Further reading 
 Lowry, Dave (1987) "Jo: Art of the Japanese Short Staff" Black Belt Communications, p. 25. 
 Oscar Ratti, Adele Westbrook (1991) "Secrets of the Samurai: A Survey of the Martial Arts of Feudal Japan" Tuttle Publishing. 

Samurai staff weapons
Staff weapons of Japan

sv:Japanska stavvapen#Hanbo